William of Enckevoirt, also spelled as Enckenvoirt (1464 in Mierlo-Hout – 19 July 1534 in Rome) was a Dutch Cardinal, bishop of Tortosa from 1524 to 1524, and bishop of Utrecht from 1529 to 1534.

Biography

Enckevoirt was the son of a farmer, Willem van Enckevoirt Sr., and aspired to a career in the church. He studied at Leuven, where he probably studied under Adriaan Boeyens, the later Pope Adrian VI. In 1489 he was sent to Rome, where he continued his studies at the Sapienza, and he achieved his Licentiate in 1505.

In 1495 William entered the papal court, and he collected many prebends, so that he collected the income of parishes without actually being there, an accepted practice in those days. He represented the interests of the parishes in Rome. He also managed to obtain high posts in Rome for several of his family members.

Through the election of Pope Adrian VI in 1522 his influence further increased, and together with Theodoricus Hezius he was a personal confidant of the pope. Before pope Adrian died, one of his last requests was that William be made cardinal. Some cardinals opposed this, but Adrian pushed his decision through and William was created Cardinal-priest of St. John and Paul on 10 September 1523. He was only the second cardinal ever created from the northern Netherlands, and the only cardinal created during Adrian's short reign.

After the death of Adrian in 1523, William of Enckevoirt maintained his high positions and continued his involvement in politics, such as the transfer of all lands of the Bishopric of Utrecht to Charles V, Holy Roman Emperor, and the crowning of Charles V as emperor in 1530. During the 1527 sacking of Rome by imperial troops, he paid 40,000 scudi to Captain Odone to protect his house and properties. In 1529 he was appointed bishop of Utrecht by pope Clement VII, but he was hardly ever there; he last visited the Netherlands in 1532.

William, who was the executor of Adrian VI's will, took the initiative in erecting a funerary monument for him in Santa Maria dell'Anima. The monument was designed by Baldassare Peruzzi and included William's name and arms. He also financed the decoration of the Barbara chapel in this church by painter Michiel Coxcie.

William of Enckevoirt died on 19 July 1534. His monument, created by Giovanni Mangone, was originally located opposite of Adrian VI's tomb, but it was moved in 1575. It is still visible next to the main entrance of the church.

While cardinal, he was the principal consecrator of: Pedro Malgareso, Bishop of Dulcigno (1529); Bernardino de Soria, Bishop of Ravello (1529); and Miguel Torcella, Bishop of Alife (1533).

Bibliography 
Notes

References
P.J. Block and P.C. Molhuysen (1912), Nieuw Nederlandsch biographisch woordenboek(NNBW), deel 2. Free digitalised version

External links
Salvador Miranda, "Cardinals of the Holy Roman church"

1464 births
1534 deaths
16th-century Roman Catholic bishops in Spain
Bishops of Utrecht
Dutch cardinals
People from Mierlo
Old University of Leuven alumni
Sapienza University of Rome alumni
16th-century Roman Catholic bishops in the Holy Roman Empire